Resolvability criterion can refer to any voting system criterion that ensures a low possibility of tie votes.

 In Nicolaus Tideman's version of the criterion, for every (possibly tied) winner in a result, there must exist a way for one added vote to make that winner unique.
 Douglas R. Woodall's version requires that the proportion of profiles giving a tie approaches zero as the number of voters increases toward infinity.

Methods that satisfy both versions include approval voting, range voting, Borda count, instant-runoff voting, minimax Condorcet, plurality, Tideman's ranked pairs, and Schulze.

Methods that violate both versions include Copeland's method and the Slater rule.

References

Electoral system criteria